Al-Ourche  is a cercle of Taoudénit Region, Mali.

References 

 

Cercles of Mali